"Back to You" is the second solo single of English singer and songwriter Louis Tomlinson, featuring American singer-songwriter Bebe Rexha and English DJ and producer Digital Farm Animals. It was written by Tomlinson, Digital Farm Animals, Pablo Bowman, Richard Boardman, and Sarah Blanchard, while the production was handled by Digital Farm Animals and Tommy Danvers. The single was released on 21 July 2017; its accompanying music video premiered the same date.

Background and release
"Back to You" is the second solo single released by Louis Tomlinson after the announced hiatus of One Direction. The song was released via his own label, 78 Productions. It was later confirmed Tomlinson signed a solo recording deal with Epic Records.

On 26 June, it was announced via two consecutive tweets from Tomlinson's Twitter that the song would be released at the end of July. The release date was later confirmed as 21 July.

Composition
"Back to You" comprises mid-tempo beats and piano chords. Lars Brandle of Billboard noted an "urban-textured" production. Lyrically, the song discusses returning to an on-again, off-again relationship. Tomlinson declared about its composition:

Music video 
A music video for the song was filmed in Tomlinson's hometown of Doncaster, England in May 2017, subsequently being released alongside the single on 21 July 2017. In the video Tomlinson and Rexha appear in various Doncaster locations, including Doncaster Rovers Football Club's Keepmoat Stadium. As of October 2020, the music video has received more than 450 million views on YouTube.

Critical reception
Mike Wass of Idolator wrote in his review, "As far as 1D solo offerings go, this is fairly solid." Mark Savage of BBC Music described the track as "a brooding pop concoction." In Entertainment Weekly, Ariana Bacle called it "[an] infectious jam."

Track listing

Charts

Weekly charts

Year-end charts

Certifications

Release history

Awards and nominations

References

External links

2017 songs
2017 singles
Louis Tomlinson songs
Bebe Rexha songs
Digital Farm Animals songs
Songs written by Louis Tomlinson
Songs written by Digital Farm Animals
Songs written by Richard Boardman
Songs written by Pablo Bowman
Songs written by Sarah Blanchard
Song recordings produced by Digital Farm Animals
Male–female vocal duets